The American Game is a 1979 documentary film directed by Jay Freund and David Wolf contrasting the experiences of two high-school seniors, basketball players from remarkably different backgrounds.

Synopsis
Brian Walker is taken from his close-knit Indiana family, living in a small town. In contrast, Stretch Graham has practically no family support, and looks to his Brooklyn team and his warm-hearted coach for support. Both are actively being recruited by colleges.

Cast
 Nathaniel Bellamy Jr as a basketball player
 Brian Walker as a basketball player
 Gil Ferschtman   
 Stretch Graham   
 Jules Irving   
 David Tawil

Reception
In a review for The New York Times, Janet Maslin described the film as one that "hovers precariously between personality study and overview, never fully committing itself to either avenue of exploration." She concluded that the film was best when sticking to the interview footage, but criticized the editing of the basketball sequences and the inclusion of "peppy" transitional sequences that look and sound like a "soft-drink comercial".

References

External links
 

1979 films
Documentary films about basketball
American basketball films
1979 documentary films
American sports documentary films
High school basketball in the United States
Documentary films about high school in the United States
Films shot in Indiana
Films shot in New York City
Films set in Brooklyn
Films set in Indiana
1970s English-language films
1970s American films